"And So It Goes" is a song written by Paul Overstreet and Don Schlitz, and recorded by American country music artist John Denver and American music group Nitty Gritty Dirt Band.  It was released in May 1989 as the second single from the Nitty Gritty Dirt Band's album Will the Circle Be Unbroken: Volume Two.  The song peaked at number 14 on the Billboard Hot Country Singles chart and reached number 29 on the RPM Country Tracks chart in Canada.

Chart performance

References

1989 singles
Nitty Gritty Dirt Band songs
John Denver songs
Songs written by Paul Overstreet
Songs written by Don Schlitz
Vocal collaborations
1989 songs